Pompton Plains is a former railroad station in Pequannock Township, Morris County, New Jersey. United States. Located at 33 Evans Place in the Pompton Plains section of Pequannock, the station is a former stop on the Erie Railroad's Greenwood Lake Division (former New York and Greenwood Lake Railway). The station was a single side-platform station with service from Wanaque–Midvale station in Wanaque to Pavonia Terminal in Jersey City, where connections were made to ferries to New York City. The next station north was Pompton–Riverdale after 1951 (Riverdale station before 1951). The next station south was Pequannock station.

Service through Pompton Plains began in January 1873 as part of a railroad from Jersey City to Greenwood Lake and Sterling Forest, New York. The station became part of the New York and Greenwood Lake in 1878 and the Erie Railroad in 1896. Service through to Greenwood Lake ended in 1935 and replaced to Wanaque. In October 1963, the station became part of a shuttle line operated by the Erie-Lackawanna Railroad between Wanaque–Midvale and Mountain View station in Wayne. Passenger service at Pompton Plains ended on September 30, 1966 as part of several cuts by the Erie-Lackawanna.

The station was added to the National Register of Historic Places on March 5, 2008.

History
James R. Evans was the station agent from the 1870s to turn of the 20th century. Regular passenger train service for the train station ended in 1963, although shuttles from Mountain View remained until 1966.  Freight service to the station continued into the early 1980s.

More recently, the station building was used as a clothing consignment shop, and later as a State Farm insurance office. The station and site were purchased by Pequannock Township in 2005. The station was restored in 2009 and currently serves as the Pequannock Township Museum.

See also
Operating Passenger Railroad Stations Thematic Resource (New Jersey)
National Register of Historic Places listings in Morris County, New Jersey

Bibliography

References

External links
 
 View of Pompton Plains Railroad Station via Google Street View
 Pequannock Township Museum

Pequannock Township, New Jersey
Gothic Revival architecture in New Jersey
Railway stations in the United States opened in 1873
Railway stations in Morris County, New Jersey
Railway stations on the National Register of Historic Places in New Jersey
Former Erie Railroad stations
Former railway stations in New Jersey
Museums in Morris County, New Jersey
History museums in New Jersey
National Register of Historic Places in Morris County, New Jersey
Railway stations closed in 1966
1873 establishments in New Jersey
New Jersey Register of Historic Places
1966 disestablishments in New Jersey